Mario Ćurić (born 28 September 1998) is a Croatian professional footballer who plays as a midfielder for FC Torpedo Moscow of the Russian Premier League.

Club career
In the summer transfer window of 2019, Šibenik signed Ćurić from fellow second league side Solin.

On 8 September 2022, Ćurić signed with FC Torpedo Moscow in Russia.

International career 
He has been capped once for Croatia U16 in a friendly game against Kuwait .

Career statistics

References

External links

1998 births
Footballers from Split, Croatia
Living people
Association football midfielders
Croatian footballers
Croatia youth international footballers
HNK Hajduk Split II players
NK Solin players
HNK Šibenik players
FC Torpedo Moscow players
Croatian Football League players
First Football League (Croatia) players
Russian Premier League players
Croatian expatriate footballers
Expatriate footballers in Russia
Croatian expatriate sportspeople in Russia